Synegiodes is a genus of moths in the family Geometridae.

Species
Synegiodes brunnearia (Leech, 1897)
Synegiodes diffusifascia Swinhoe, 1892
Synegiodes histrionaria Swinhoe, 1892
Synegiodes hyriaria (Walker, 1866)
Synegiodes obliquifascia Prout, 1918
Synegiodes punicearia Xue, 1992
Synegiodes sanguinaria (Moore, 1868)

References
Natural History Museum Lepidoptera genus database

Sterrhinae